Irving Campbell (born December 4, 1984) is a former American football player. His family later moved to Lake Worth, Florida, where he was raised. He played wide receiver for Georgia Southern and Michigan State. He was signed as a free agent by the Jacksonville Sharks in 2009.

External links
 Jacksonville Sharks bio

1984 births
Living people
American football wide receivers
Wilkes-Barre/Scranton Pioneers players
Jacksonville Sharks players
Sportspeople from Managua
People from Lake Worth Beach, Florida
Players of American football from Florida